Pitao may refer to:
 Pitavia punctata
 Zapotec deities